Coatbridge and Airdrie was a constituency represented in the House of Commons of the Parliament of the United Kingdom. It returned one Member of Parliament (MP) from 1950 until 1983.

It was then replaced by the Monklands West constituency.

Boundaries
The constituency location is in northern Lanarkshire, to the north of Bothwell and to the east of Glasgow. From 1885 until 1983 Coatbridge and Airdrie were linked for parliamentary purposes. The seat was named Coatbridge and Airdrie after 1950.

In the 1885-1918 period the area formed the county constituency of Coatbridge. In the 1918 redistribution the burgh constituency of Coatbridge was created. The seat was defined in 1918 as comprising the burghs of Airdrie and Coatbridge.

The change in the constituency name in 1950 did not affect the boundaries. Apart from a small boundary change to Airdrie, which took effect for parliamentary purposes in 1955, its boundaries did not alter until the areas parliamentary representation was remodelled in 1983.

From the 1983 general election the area was divided between two new seats. It provided the majority of the electorate for both Monklands East and Monklands West. 34,802 electors in the old seat were included in the new East constituency (57.1% of the old seat and 72.2% of the new one). 26,148 voters found themselves in Monklands West (42.9% of the old seat and 53.4% of the new one).

Members of Parliament

Election results

Elections in the 1950s

Elections in the 1960s

Elections in the 1970s

Elections in 1980s

 Death of James Dempsey

References

 Boundaries of Parliamentary Constituencies 1885-1972, compiled and edited by F.W.S. Craig (Parliamentary Reference Publications 1972)
 The BBC/ITN Guide to the New Parliamentary Constituencies, (Parliamentary Research Services 1983)

See also 
 1982 Coatbridge and Airdrie by-election

Historic parliamentary constituencies in Scotland (Westminster)
Constituencies of the Parliament of the United Kingdom established in 1950
Constituencies of the Parliament of the United Kingdom disestablished in 1983
Coatbridge
1950 establishments in Scotland
Politics of North Lanarkshire
Airdrie, North Lanarkshire